DC5, DC-5, or DC 5 may refer to:

 Douglas DC-5, a twin-propeller passenger aircraft
 Honda Integra (fourth generation), chassis code DC5, a Japanese Sports car known as the Acura RSX in North America
 The D.C. Five, five U.S. citizens convicted by Pakistan of plotting terrorist attacks
 The Dave Clark Five, a British rock group
 DC5, municipality code for Central Karoo District Municipality, South Africa
 District of Columbia Route 5 (DC 5), a part of state highway Maryland Route 5 from 1939 to 1949
 DC-5, a game offered by the D.C. Lottery
 Defense Condition 5, a well known team from the Battlefield series